The 2018 Oceania Swimming Championships was held from 25 to 30 June 2018 at the Taurama Aquatic Centre in Port Moresby, Papua New Guinea. It was the twelfth edition of the biennial championships as well as the first to be held in Port Moresby. The tournament featured competition in swimming and open water swimming.

Participating nations
A total of sixteen teams have confirmed participation for the 2018 Oceania Swimming Championships:

Event summary

Men's events

Women's events

Mixed events

References

External links
Official website
Results

Oceania Swimming Championships, 2018
Oceania Swimming Championships, 2018
Oceania Swimming Championships
Swimming competitions in Papua New Guinea
International sports competitions hosted by Papua New Guinea
Oceania Swimming Championships